The City of Ventura Historic Landmarks and Districts consist of buildings, sites, and neighborhoods designated by the City of Ventura, California, as historic landmarks and districts. 

The first six sites designated as Ventura Historic Landmarks (VHL) were selected in February 1974. They are: the Olivas Adobe (VHL No. 1), the Ortega Adobe (VHL No. 2), the Father Serra statue (VHL No. 3), Ventura City Hall (VHL No. 4), the Grant Park cross site (VHL No. 5), and the Mission Plaza archeological site (VHL No. 6). In July 1974, the City also designated a second group of landmarks, including the Conklin residence (VHL No. 7), the Mission San Buenaventura (VHL No. 10), the Mission's Norfolk pine trees (VHL No. 8), and two large Moreton Bay fig trees located in city parks (VHL Nos. 11-12).

As of April 10, 2018, the City had designated 111 sites as Ventura Historic Landmarks and five areas as Ventura Historic Districts. The first historic district designated by the city was the Mission Historic District, extending from Poli Street at the northern border to Santa Clara Street at the southern border, and from Ventura Avenue on the west to Palm Street on the east. The Mission Historic District consists of the oldest section of the city's downtown area and includes more than 10 historic landmarks, including the Mission, the Mission Plaza archeological site, the Mission's Norfolk pines, the Mission Plaza Moreton Bay fig tree, Peirano Store (VHL No. 32), the Carlo Hahn House (VHL No. 78), the Mission Lavanderia (VHL No. 85),  and China Alley (VHL No. 91).

A map depicting the location of Ventura's designated historic landmarks and districts can be viewed by clicking "OpenStreetMap" or "Google Maps" in the template found to the right below.

Ventura Historic Landmarks

Ventura Historic Districts

Other designations

Other Ventura sites receiving historic designations:

 Thomas Gould Jr. House. American Craftsman style California bungalow at 402 Lynn Drive, built in 1924 and designed by Henry Greene of Greene and Greene. The house was listed on the National Register of Historic Places in 2005.

 Old Mission Reservoir. Part of the water system for Mission San Buenaventura (the settling tank or receiving reservoir; the site can be found in Eastwood Park); designated as California Historical Landmark No. 114.

 Santa Gertrudis Asistencia (Chapel) Monument. The structure was built in 1809 and ceased operation around 1840. The site was in the path of the Ojai freeway, and the remains were moved in 1968 with several foundation stones being used to create the monument. Located 0.3 miles north of the Avenue Water Treatment Facility (VHL 100) on the east side of the road, flanked by two cypress trees. Designated as Ventura County Historical Landmark No. 11 in December 1970.

 Five Trees. Five blue gum eucalyptus trees on the hilltop overlooking Ventura were designated in 1987 as Ventura County Historical Landmark No. 110. Joseph Sexton planted a row of 13 trees in 1898, but a 1903 fire destroyed all but five of the trees. Three of the remaining trees were cut down by vandals in 1940 but were replaced. In 1956, four of the trees were cut down, leaving only one. Replacement trees were planted in 1966 but only two remain.

See also
 National Register of Historic Places listings in Ventura County, California
 California Historical Landmarks in Ventura County, California
 Ventura County Historic Landmarks & Points of Interest

References

 

Ventura
Ventura
Ventura
Ventura